Lemon chicken is the name of several dishes found in cuisines around the world which include chicken and lemon.

In Canadian- and British-Chinese cuisine, it usually consists of pieces of chicken meat that are sautéed or battered and deep-fried and coated with a thick, sweet lemon-flavored sauce. The Chinese restaurant of the Panda Hotel in Tsuen Wan, Hong Kong used to serve its version of lemon chicken with the chicken pieces coated in batter, then rolled in almond slivers and deep-fried and served with the lemon-glaze sauce.

A version of lemon chicken popular in Australasia involves coating the chicken in batter, frying it and then covering the chicken with a lemon sauce.

Lemon chicken in Italy and Greece consists of a whole chicken pan-roasted with white wine, lemon juice, fresh thyme and mirepoix.

In Spain, a similar dish,  also includes pine nuts, rosemary and ham.

French  includes Dijon mustard in the sauce, and is accompanied by roasted potatoes.

See also
 Orange chicken
 Pineapple chicken
 List of chicken dishes
 List of lemon dishes and beverages

References

External links
Newspaper articles about lemon chicken from New York City, 1969-1995

American Chinese chicken dishes
Canadian Chinese chicken dishes
Italian cuisine
Australian Chinese cuisine
New Zealand Chinese cuisine
Chinese chicken dishes
Cantonese cuisine
Hong Kong cuisine
Spanish cuisine
Lemon dishes